Howard Q. Dee (born 1930) is a Filipino businessman and philanthropist who was the Philippine ambassador to the Holy See and Malta from 1986 to 1990. He received the Ramon Magsaysay Award in 2018.

References

1930 births
Ramon Magsaysay Award winners
Ambassadors of the Philippines to the Holy See
Living people